NGC 334 is a barred spiral galaxy in the constellation Sculptor. It was discovered on September 25, 1834 by John Herschel. It was described by Dreyer as "very faint, small, round, gradually a little brighter middle, 2 stars of 11th magnitude to south."

References

0334
18340925
Sculptor (constellation)
Barred spiral galaxies
Discoveries by John Herschel
003514